Schroth is a surname of Germanic origin and may refer to:

Carl-Heinz Schroth (1902–1989), German actor and film director
Frances Schroth (1893–1961), American swimmer and Olympic competitor
Frank D. Schroth, (1884–1974), American newspaper publisher 
George Schroth (1899–1989), American water polo player and Olympic competitor
Hannelore Schroth (1922–1987), German film actress
Heinrich Schroth (1871–1945), German stage and film actor
Johann Schroth (1798–1856), Austrian naturopath
Lajos Schróth (b. 1960), Hungarian former professional football player 
Markus Schroth (b. 1975), German football player
Thomas N. Schroth (1920–2009), American reporter
Walther Schroth (1882–1944), German General der Infanterie in the Wehrmacht during World War II

German-language surnames